Scott Stankavage (born July 5, 1962) is a retired American football quarterback. He played his high school football at Central Bucks High School East in Buckingham Township, Pennsylvania, his college football at North Carolina, and his professional career for the Denver Broncos and Miami Dolphins of the National Football League (NFL).

Family
He was married to Susan Walsh, a former top-level swimmer, from 1986–1997. They have three children: Sarah Elizabeth (born July 12, 1988 in Chapel Hill, North Carolina) and Shelby (born 1991) are fitness instructors for Flywheel Sports, whereas Shawn (born 1996) played football for Vanderbilt.

In 2005, Scott married Katherine Dillon Stankavage, a yoga teacher.  They have four children together; triplets born in 2009: Ella Elizabeth, Leo Dillon and Madison Quinn.  Their fourth child, Jordan Grace, was born in 2011.

References

1962 births
Living people
American football quarterbacks
Denver Broncos players
Miami Dolphins players
North Carolina Tar Heels football players
Players of American football from Philadelphia
National Football League replacement players